Orthotylus boreellus is a species of bug from the Miridae family that can be found in Finland, Norway, Sweden, and Central Russia.

References

Insects described in 1876
Hemiptera of Europe
boreellus